Derichebourg is a French global operator at the international level in environmental services to businesses and local and municipal authorities in 10 countries on 3 continents. Its activities can be divided into two separate branches: the Environment division and the Multiservices division.

Its head office is in the 12th arrondissement of Paris.

Overview of businesses 
The Derichebourg Group is a player at the international level in the provision of services to businesses and to local and municipal authorities. Derichebourg covers the entire waste recycling chain, from collection to recovery, as well as a full range of Business Services and Public Sector Services, including cleaning, temporary work, energy and outsourced aeronautical services.

The Environmental Services’ core business is the processing and disposal of waste – mainly metal waste – and of end-of-life products, with recovery of secondary raw materials by using appropriate processing methods. Environmental Services have become a cornerstone in the international environmental protection policy. The Environmental Services and Multiservices divisions are subject to different economic cycles.

The Group’s historic business is the recycling of scrap metal. This activity is somewhat cyclical in nature and depends on the performance of the steel and metallurgy industries. In the mid-2000s, the desire to add a more resilient business to recycling led to the acquisition of Multiservices/Facilities activities. Today, the Derichebourg Group has two subsidiaries : Derichebourg Environnement and Derichebourg Multiservices.

Daniel Derichebourg is the founder and current CEO of Derichebourg Group.

Subsidiaries

Derichebourg Environnement 

 Recycling in France: Revival, Eska, Purfer, AFM, Inorec, Refinal, CashMetal, Fricom, Valme, Corepa  
 Recycling in Belgium: George
 Recycling in Mexico: Derichebourg Recycling Mexico
 Recycling in the United States of America: Derichebourg Recycling USA
 Recycling in Germany: Derichebourg Umwelt
 Recycling in Spain: Derichebourg Espana, Derichebourg Medio Ambiente
 Waste Management in France: Polyurbaine, Derichebourg Environnement
 Waste Management in Canada: Derichebourg Canada

Derichebourg Multiservices 

 Derichebourg Aeronautics Services (France, USA, UK, China, Spain, Germany)
 Derichebourg Logistique & Manutention (France)
 Derichebourg Propreté et Services associés (France)
 Derichebourg Technologies (France)
 Derichebourg FM (Facility Management - France)
 Derichebourg Accueil (France)
 Derichebourg Energie (France)
 Derichebourg Energie E.P. (France)
 Derichebourg V.R.D. Espaces Verts (France)
 Derichebourg SNG (France)
 Derichebourg Intérim et Recrutement (France)
 Derichebourg Aeronautics Recruitment (France, Spain, Germany)
 Derichebourg Aeronautics Training (France)
 Derichebourg Facility Services (Portugal, Spain)

Boris Derichebourg is the current CEO of Derichebourg Multiservices.

References

External links 
 

Service companies of France
Companies listed on Euronext Paris